The Tuostakh (Tuostaax) is a river in the Verkhoyansk District, Sakha (Yakutia), Russia. It is a left hand tributary of the Adycha, of the Yana basin.

Grayling, lenok and taimen are found in the waters of the river. The name of the river originated in the Yakut word "tuos", meaning "birch" The nearest city is Batagay, and the nearest airfield Batagay Airport.

Course 
The Tuostakh begins in the middle section of the Chersky Range at the confluence of rivers Khara-Sala and Boldymba in the western slopes of the Dogdo Range, between the Polar circle and the northern end of the Chibagalakh Range. It heads roughly northwest meandering slowly across a very swampy area dotted with small lakes where it divides into channels. After turning west in a wide arch at the feet of the southern side of the Kisilyakh Range the river joins the right bank of the Adycha downstream from the Charky.

The main tributaries of the Tuostakh are the Dogdo and the Tirekhtyakh, both from the right. The river freezes in October and stays under thick ice until the end of May or early June.

See also
List of rivers of Russia

References

Rivers of the Sakha Republic